Savelli is an Italian surname that may refer to:

Alessandro Savelli (1905–1930), Italian football player
Antonello Savelli (c. 1450–1498), Italian condottiero, member of the Savelli family
Fabrizio Savelli (1607–1659), Italian military leader, member of the Savelli family
Federico Savelli (died 1649), Italian military commander, member of the Savelli family
Giacomo Savelli (cardinal) (1523–1587), Italian Roman Catholic cardinal and bishop, member of the Savelli family
Giovanni Battista Savelli (1422–1498), Italian cardinal, member of the Savelli family
Guy Savelli, American martial artist
Jean-Marc Savelli (born 1955), French pianist
Luca Savelli (1190–1266), Roman senator 
Pandolfo Savelli (died 1306), member of the Savelli family
Pope Honorius III (Cencio Savelli, 1150–1227), Pope and member of the Savelli family
Pope Honorius IV (Giacomo Savelli, c.1210–1287), Pope and member of the Savelli family
Silvio Savelli (died 1515), Italian condottiero, member of the Savelli family

See also 
Savelli family
Savelli (disambiguation)

Italian-language surnames